Samuel Ayorinde (born 20 October 1974) is a Nigerian former footballer who played at both professional and international levels.
A striker, he played professionally for a number clubs throughout Africa, Europe and Asia, and he represented Nigeria at senior international level.

Club career
Ayorinde was born in Lagos on 20 October 1974, and played club football for NEPA Lagos, Stade Tunisien and Sturm Graz, before joining Leyton Orient in September 1995 though a lengthy wait for a work permit meant he did not make his league debut against Cambridge United until May 1996. He made 16 league and cup appearances for Orient, scoring two goals, but could not hold down a place in the first team and, after a succession of loan moves, transferred to Football Conference side Dover Athletic in December 1997. He later played for Bangor City, Hapoel Beit She'an, Assyriska, Stalybridge Celtic, AIK, Shenyang Ginde, Syrianska, Da Nang, Persija Jakarta, Gröndals IK and Djurgårdsbrunns FC.

International career
Ayorinde earned two caps for Nigeria between 1998 and 2003.

References

External links
  

1974 births
Living people
Sportspeople from Lagos
Nigerian footballers
Nigerian expatriate footballers
Nigeria international footballers
Nigerian expatriate sportspeople in Tunisia
Nigerian expatriate sportspeople in Austria
Nigerian expatriate sportspeople in England
Nigerian expatriate sportspeople in Finland
Nigerian expatriate sportspeople in Israel
Nigerian expatriate sportspeople in Sweden
Nigerian expatriate sportspeople in China
Nigerian expatriate sportspeople in Vietnam
Nigerian expatriate sportspeople in Indonesia
Expatriate footballers in Tunisia
Expatriate footballers in Austria
Expatriate footballers in England
Expatriate footballers in Finland
Expatriate footballers in Wales
Expatriate footballers in Israel
Expatriate footballers in Sweden
Expatriate footballers in China
Expatriate footballers in Vietnam
Expatriate footballers in Indonesia
Association football forwards
NEPA Lagos players
Stade Tunisien players
SK Sturm Graz players
Leyton Orient F.C. players
FF Jaro players
Dover Athletic F.C. players
Bangor City F.C. players
Hapoel Beit She'an F.C. players
Assyriska FF players
Stalybridge Celtic F.C. players
AIK Fotboll players
Changsha Ginde players
Syrianska FC players
SHB Da Nang FC players
Persija Jakarta players
Gröndals IK players
English Football League players
Veikkausliiga players
Allsvenskan players
Djurgårdsbrunns FC players